Jessica is a 1962 comedy drama film directed by Jean Negulesco, starring Maurice Chevalier, Angie Dickinson and Sylva Koscina, with cinematography by Piero Portalupi and art direction by Giulio Bongini. It was a co-production between France, Italy and the United States. Location shooting took place around Forza d'Agrò on Sicily.

Plot
When her husband dies in Sicily while on their honeymoon, Jessica, a nurse, decides to remain there rather than return home and becomes a midwife in the village of Forza d'Agrò.

Men of the town pay quite a bit of attention to the attractive Jessica, causing women to resent her presence. While she at times welcomes their attentions, she has a strict rule to never get involved with any man who has any standing attachment to another woman.  The wives conspire to abstain from relations with their husbands, reasoning that if no babies are born, no midwife is needed. Parish priest Father Antonio disapproves of their scheme.

Jessica develops a romantic interest in Edmondo Raumo, a marchese who has been a recluse since being injured during the war. Raumo lies about his true identity, telling Jessica that he is a humble fisherman. She becomes angry when the truth is finally known and intends to leave Sicily forever. However, a villager who has been kind to her is dying, and the situation brings her closer to Raumo.  At the end of the story, the wives of the town have accepted her, and renewed relations with their husbands, leading to a baby boom.  And when she comes to the church during mass, to announce the birth of twins, she sits next to Edmundo, on his ceremonial bench near the altar—indicating she is now Marchesa Raumo.

Cast

References

External links

1962 films
American romantic comedy films
Italian romantic comedy films
French romantic comedy films
English-language Italian films
English-language French films
Films directed by Jean Negulesco
Films scored by Mario Nascimbene
Films set in Sicily
Films shot in Sicily
1960s romance films
United Artists films
1960s English-language films
1960s American films
1960s Italian films
1960s French films